Gohan or Son Gohan is a fictional character from the Dragon Ball series.

Gohan may also refer to:
 Gohan River, a tributary of the Olt River, Romania
 Gohan-eup, a town in Jeongseon, Gangwon Province, South Korea
 Grandpa Son Gohan, adopted grandfather of Goku in Dragon Ball
 Rice dishes (御飯) in Japanese cuisine
 Gal Gohan, a manga series

See also
 
 Gökhan, a Turkish given name